Campoo de Yuso is a municipality located in the autonomous community of Cantabria, Spain. According to the 2007 census, the city has a population of 759 inhabitants. Its capital is La Costana.

References

External links
Campoo de Yuso - Cantabria 102 Municipios

Municipalities in Cantabria